Naalai Unathu Naal is a 1984 Indian Tamil-language crime thriller film, directed by A. Jagannathan and produced by Kalavathi C. The film stars Vijayakanth, Nalini and Jaishankar. It is heavily inspired by Agatha Christie's And Then There Were None (1939), and is a remake of the Hindi film Gumnaam (1965). The film was released on 7 September 1984.

Plot 

The movie is about a group of lucky draw winners getting stranded in an unknown, unspecified jungle while travelling to the US. Seven people mysteriously win a free vacation. On the way to their destination, the plane has engine trouble and they are left abandoned in a remote seaside location. They find shelter in a large mansion inhabited by a comical butler Angalamma. One by one, they are murdered and the remaining vacationers try to figure out why they were chosen for the trip and what they have in common.

Cast 
Vijayakanth as Arun
Nalini as Kalpana
Jaishankar as Devadas
Senthamarai as Dr. Nagaraj
Sivachandran as Vivekananthan (Prakash)
Goundamani as Varadhan
Sathyaraj as David
V. Gopalakrishnan as Dharmaraj
S. V. Ramadoss as Ramanathan
Manorama as Angalamma
Agalya as Rekha
Anuradha in Item Number

Production 
Ravi, Vijayakanth's stunt double, died during production, and the film was dedicated to him.

Soundtrack 
The music was composed by Ilaiyaraaja.

Reception 
Jeyamanmadhan of Kalki praised the performance of Manorama, the songs of Ilaiyaraaja but was critical of his re-recording; he felt the reveal of the murderer was lack of spice.

References

External links 
 

1980s crime thriller films
1980s Tamil-language films
1984 films
Films directed by A. Jagannathan
Films scored by Ilaiyaraaja
Indian crime thriller films